Philoponella is a genus of uloborid spiders. Like all Uloboridae, these species have no venom.

Cooperation
Some species (among them P. congregabilis and P. oweni) construct communal webs, but nevertheless do not capture prey cooperatively. However, a few species, such as P. raffrayi, are known to cooperate in prey capture. A colony of P. raffrayi is composed of individual orb-webs connected by non-adhesive silk. Its average body length is about 6 mm in females and 3 mm in males. Adult females are orange for at least a week after the final molt, and become black a few weeks later. In these colonies, Argyrodes and Portia species can also be found, acting as kleptoparasites and predators, respectively. When relatively large prey is trapped on the periphery of the colony, two females cooperate in about 10% of cases in wrapping it, which increases their chances of success about fourfold. However, only one female then feeds on this prey. Cooperative capture is similar in P. republicana, where more than two individuals may work together.

Philoponella vicina uses its silk to compress and crush its prey.

Distribution
Philoponella species occur pantropical in the Americas, Africa, southeastern Asia and Australia, with almost half of them found from the southern United States to northern Argentina.

Species
, it contains 43 species:

 Philoponella alata (Lin & Li, 2008) — China
 Philoponella angolensis (Lessert, 1933) — Ivory Coast, Angola
 Philoponella arizonica (Gertsch, 1936) — USA, Mexico
 Philoponella bella Opell, 1979 — Colombia
 Philoponella collina (Keyserling, 1883) — Peru
 Philoponella congregabilis (Rainbow, 1916) — New South Wales
 Philoponella cymbiformis Xie et al., 1997 — China
 Philoponella divisa Opell, 1979 — Colombia
 Philoponella duopunctata Faleiro & Santos, 2014 — Brazil
 Philoponella fasciata (Mello-Leitão, 1917) — Brazil, Paraguay, Argentina
 Philoponella feroka (Bradoo, 1979) — India
 Philoponella fluviidulcifis (Faleiro & Santos, 2014) — Brazil
 Philoponella gibberosa (Kulczynski, 1908) — Java
 Philoponella herediae Opell, 1987 — Costa Rica
 Philoponella hilaris (Simon, 1906) — India
 Philoponella lingulata Dong, Zhu & Yoshida, 2005 — China
 Philoponella lunaris (C. L. Koch, 1839) — Brazil
 Philoponella mollis (Thorell, 1895) — Myanmar
 Philoponella nasuta (Thorell, 1895) — China, Myanmar
 Philoponella nigromaculata Yoshida, 1992 — Taiwan
 Philoponella opelli (Faleiro & Santos, 2014) — Ecuador, Brazil
 Philoponella operosa (Simon, 1896) — South Africa
 Philoponella oweni (Chamberlin, 1924) — USA, Mexico
 Philoponella pantherina (Keyserling, 1890) — New South Wales
 Philoponella para Opell, 1979 — Paraguay, Argentina
 Philoponella pisiformis Dong, Zhu & Yoshida, 2005 — China
 Philoponella pomelita Grismado, 2004 — Argentina
 Philoponella prominens (Bösenberg & Strand, 1906) — China, Korea, Japan
 Philoponella quadrituberculata (Thorell, 1892) — Java, Moluccas
 Philoponella raffrayi (Simon, 1891) — Java, Moluccas
 Philoponella ramirezi Grismado, 2004 — Brazil
 Philoponella republicana (Simon, 1891) — Panama to Bolivia
 Philoponella rostralis (Shilpa & Sudhikumar, 2022) — India
 Philoponella sabah Yoshida, 1992 — Borneo
 Philoponella semiplumosa (Simon, 1893) — USA, Greater Antilles to Venezuela
 Philoponella signatella (Roewer, 1951) — Mexico to Honduras
 Philoponella subvittata Opell, 1981 — Guyana
 Philoponella tingens (Chamberlin & Ivie, 1936) — Costa Rica to Colombia
 Philoponella truncata (Thorell, 1895) — Myanmar, Java
 Philoponella variabilis (Keyserling, 1887) — Queensland, New South Wales
 Philoponella vicina (O. P.-Cambridge, 1899) — Mexico to Costa Rica
 Philoponella vittata (Keyserling, 1881) — Panama to Paraguay
 Philoponella wuyiensis Xie et al., 1997 — China

Footnotes

References
 Tamerlan Thorell (1895). Descriptive catalogue of the spiders of Burma
  Opell, B.D. (1987). "The new species Philoponella herediae and its modified orb-web (Araneae, Uloboridae)". J. Arachnol. 15: 59-63. PDF
 Matsumoto, Toshiya (1998). "Cooperative prey capture in the communal web spider, Philoponella raffray (Araneae, Uloboridae)". Journal of Arachnology 26: 392-396. PDF
 Grismado, Christian J. (2004). "Two new species of the genus Philoponella from Brazil and Argentina (Araneae, Uloboridae)". Iheringia, Sér. Zool. 94(1): 105-109. PDF
 Platnick, Norman I. (2008). The world spider catalog, version 8.5. American Museum of Natural History.

Uloboridae
Araneomorphae genera
Taxa named by Cândido Firmino de Mello-Leitão
Pantropical spiders